The Arnold Farmstead was a historic farmstead near McRae and Maple Streets in Searcy, Arkansas.  The farmstead included a Craftsman-style main house and a collection of outbuildings consisting of a chicken coop, privy, well house, and fruit cellar.  The house was a -story wood-frame structure that was roughly T-shaped with additions.  The south-facing front was sheltered by a full-width porch, which wrapped around the west side.  Although suburban residences have encroached on its formerly rural setting, the complex of buildings, dating to the 1920s, was remarkably well-preserved.

The property was listed on the National Register of Historic Places in 1991.  It has been listed as destroyed in the Arkansas Historic Preservation Program database, and was delisted in 2018.

See also
National Register of Historic Places listings in White County, Arkansas

References

Houses on the National Register of Historic Places in Arkansas
Houses in Searcy, Arkansas
National Register of Historic Places in Searcy, Arkansas
Former National Register of Historic Places in Arkansas
Demolished buildings and structures in Arkansas
1920s establishments in Arkansas
Farms on the National Register of Historic Places in Arkansas
Bungalow architecture in Arkansas
American Craftsman architecture in Arkansas